Marina Comas Oller (born September 1, 1996) is a Spanish Catalan actress. Her credits include the television series Polseres vermelles and the films Black Bread and Els Nens Salvatges.

Comas was born in Santa Maria de Besora, Osona.

Comas was the recipient of the Goya Award, Spain's highest award in the Dramatic Arts.

She made her debut at the age of 14 in the film Black Bread (Pa negre). Thanks to that role she won the Goya Award for best newcomer and the Gaudi Award for best supporting actress. In 2011 she participated in the film Terra baixa. Recently, she starred with Àlex Monner and Albert Baró in the film Los niños salvajes (Els nens salvatges) by Patricia Ferreira, winner of the Golden Biznaga for best film at the Malaga film festival.

References

External links
 

Living people
Spanish film actresses
Spanish television actresses
1996 births

Television actresses from Catalonia
Film actresses from Catalonia
21st-century Spanish actresses